A fly is any species of insect of the order Diptera.

Flight is the process of flying.

Fly may also refer to:

Places 
 Fly, Ohio, U.S.
 Fly, Tennessee, U.S.
 Fly River (or the Fly), New Guinea

People

Nickname or pseudonym
 Fly (artist), comic book artist and illustrator
 Fly (video game player) or Tal Aizik, Israeli Dota 2 player

Surname
 C. S. Fly (1849–1901), American photographer
 Michael Fly (born 1983), American basketball coach
 Mollie Fly (née McKie, 1847–1925), American photographer
 Per Fly (born 1960), Danish film director
 William Fly (died 1726), English pirate

Arts, entertainment, and media

Characters
 Fly (Archie Comics), an Archie Comics character who first appeared in 1959
 Fly (Impact Comics), a character from a DC Comics imprint loosely based on the Archie Comics character
 Fly, one of the three bugs in WordWorld
 Frank Fly, a video game boss from the Super Nintendo Entertainment System EarthBound
 Human Fly (comics) or The Fly, a Marvel Comics character

Films
 Fly (film), a 1970 short film by John Lennon and Yoko Ono
 The Fly (1958 film), an American horror film by Kurt Neumann
 The Fly (1986 film), a remake by David Cronenberg of the 1958 film

 To Fly!, a 1976 short IMAX documentary film

Literature
 Fly (play), a 2009 play about the Tuskegee Airmen

Music

Groups and labels
 Fast Life Yungstaz, or F.L.Y, an American hip hop group
 Fly (band), an American jazz trio
 F.L.Y., a Latvian band
 Fly Records, a British record label
 The Flys (British band), an English punk band
 The Flys (American band), an American post-grunge group

Albums and EPs
 Fly (Sarah Brightman album) (1995)
 Fly (Dixie Chicks album) (1999)
 Fly (Fly album) (2004)
 Fly (EP) (2003), by Sick Puppies
 Fly (Yoko Ono album) (1971)
 Fly (Zucchero album) (2006)

Songs
 "Fly" (Wanessa song) (2009)
 "Fly" (Sugar Ray song) (1997)
 "Fly" (Hilary Duff song) (2004)
 "Fly" (Blind Guardian song) (2006)
 "Fly" (Jars of Clay song) (2002)
 "Fly" (Nickelback song) (1996)
 "Fly (The Angel Song)", by the Wilkinsons (1998)
 "Fly" (Nicki Minaj song) (2010)
 "Fly" (Maddie & Tae song) (2015)
 "Fly" (Avril Lavigne song) (2015)
 "Fly", by Marshmello (2018)
 "Fly", an English version of the song "Vole" by Celine Dion from Falling into You (1996)
 "Fly", by Epik High (2005)
 "Fly", by iamnot from Hope (2017)
 "Fly", by Luscious Jackson from Electric Honey (1999)
 "Fly", by Veruca Salt from American Thighs (1994)
 "Fly", by SMAP (1999)
 "Fly", by Sanctus Real from The Face of Love (2006)
 "Fly", by Faye Wong from Sing and Play (1998)
 "Fly", by Nick Drake from Bryter Layter (1979)
 "Fly", by Machiavel from New Lines (1980)
 "Fly", by Ludovico Einaudi from Divenire (2007)
 "Fly", by Monkey Majik from Thank You (2006)
 "Fly", by Lucky Daye from Spies in Disguise (2019)
 "Fly", by The Jam from All Mod Cons (1978)
 "Fly", by Sara Groves from All Right Here (2002)
 "Fly", by MARi which represented New Hampshire in the American Song Contest (2022)

Radio
 Fly FM, a private radio station in Malaysia
 FLY FM 89,7, a radio station based in Greece
 Sirius XM Fly, a Sirius/XM radio station
 WFLY (FLY 92), a radio station in Albany, New York

Television
 "Fly" (Breaking Bad), an episode of Breaking Bad
 Fly TV, a former digital television channel from ABC Television, Australia

Computing 
 Fly (pentop computer), a type of computer built into a pen
 Fly! a flight simulator program for personal computers

Ships 
 Fly (brig), a brig that disappeared in 1802
 Fly (dinghy), sailing dinghy
 Fly-class brig-sloop
 HMS Fly, a list of ships of the Royal Navy

Sports 
 Fly (American football), a pattern run by a receiver in American Football
 Fly (exercise), a strength training exercise
 Fly (tent), the outer lining of a tent or stand-alone material shelter without walls
 Butterfly stroke or fly, a stroke in swimming
 Fly ball (baseball) or batted ball, a ball batted up into the air in baseball
 Artificial fly, a lure used in fly fishing tied to look like an insect

Other uses
 Fly (carriage), a light carriage
 Fly (clothing), an opening in male garments
 Fly (solitaire), a card game
 Fly, a term in flag terminology
 FLY, Tsotsitaal's ISO 639-3 language code
 F.L.Y. (roller coaster), the roller coaster at Phantasialand
 Fly system or theatrical rigging system
 Butterfly (options), also known as a fly
 Housefly

See also 

 
 
 
 The Fly (disambiguation)
 Flies (disambiguation)
 Flight, the process of flying